The Australian Science Fiction Media Awards (ASFMA Awards) were awards given annually for achievement in non-literary media and media appreciation within Australian science fiction. They were awarded at the Australian National Science Fiction Media Convention, from 1984 to 1997. The award was formally dissolved and incorporated into the Ditmar Awards at the Business Meeting of the Australian National Science Fiction Convention, Spawncon II in Melbourne in 1999, with the formal merger of the Australian "Media Natcon" and the Natcon.

Results

1983: Conquest '83, 24–25 September 1983 Brisbane

It was decided to give ASFMA awards at the annual Media Natcon, starting in 1984.

1984: Medtrek 2, March 10–11, 1984, The Shore Inn Sydney

Best Australian Media Fanzine
Chronicles

Best Australian Media Fanwriter
Sue Bursztynski

Best Australian Media Fanartist
Sue Campbell

1985: Con Amore, June 8–10, 1985, Brisbane Parkroyal Brisbane

Best Australian Media Fanzine
Chronicles

Best Australian Media Fanwriter
Sue Bursztynski

Best Australian Media Fanartist
Lynn Hendricks

1986 Galactic Tours Convention, March 7–10, 1986, Townhouse Melbourne

Best Australian Media Fanzine
Chronicles

Best Australian Media Fanwriter
Sue Bursztynski

Best Australian Media Fanartist
Robert Jan

Best Amateur Audio-Visual
Sale of 23rd Century

1987: Eccentricon, July 3–6, 1987, Hawkesbury Agricultural College N.S.W.(NSW)

Best Australian Media Fanzine
Chronicles

Best Australian Media Fanwriter
Sue Clarke

Best Australian Media Fanartist
Robert Jan

Best Amateur Audio-Visual
Perfect Botch

1988: Zencon II, October 14–16, 1988, Carlton Social Club Melbourne

Best Australian Media Fanzine
A for Andromeda
Australian Playbeing
Chronicles
Newspeak
Spock
Timeloop

Best Australian Media Fanwriter
Edwina Harvey
Gail Neville
Mark Try
Karen Herkes
Alan Stewart

Best Australian Media Fanartist
Gail Adams
David Kenyon
Phil Wlodarczyk
Ian Gunn
Mark Try

1989 Conspire, March 17–19, 1989, The Rex Hotel Canberra

Best Writer
Nikki White

Best Artist
Gail Adams

Best Fanzine
Spock

Best Audio-visual
No Award

1990: Huttcon '90, November 23–25, 1990, The Diplomat Motel Melbourne

Best Australian Media Fanzine
Starwalking Newsletter
Enarrare, edited by Ellen Parry, Annie Hamilton, Marie Letters & Christine Poulson
Spock
Psychodaleks
Captain's Log

Best Australian Media Fanwriter
Ana Dorfstad
Edwina Harvey
Moira Dahlberg
Jan McNally
Sue Isle

Best Australian Media Fanartist
Marianne Plumridge
Wendy Purcell
Bruce Mitchell
Ian Gunn
Phil Wlodarczyk

1991 Vampiricon,  October 11–13, 1991, Melbourne Townhouse

Best Writer
Alan Stewart

Best Artist
Ian Gunn

Best Fanzine
Spock Wendy Purcell

Best Media Newszine
Ethel the Aardvark edited by Alan Stewart

Best Audio-visual
Danny Heap Huttcon `90 Opening Ceremony

1992 HongCon,  June 6–8, 1992, Hotel Adelaide, S.A.

Best Fiction Zine
Steve & Martin's Excellent Fanzine Steven Scholz & Martin Reilly

Best Australian Media Newszine
3 way tie for award

Just Alice Adam Jenkins
Captain's Log Gail Adams
Ethel the Aardvark Alan Stewart

Best Australian Media Fanwriter
Martin Reilly

Best Australian Media Fanartist
Steven Scholz

Best Amateur Audio-Visual
James Bond etc George Ivanoff

1993 DefCon, June 4–7, 1993, Hotel St George Wellington New Zealand

Best Australian Media Newszine
Ethel the Aardvark edited by Alan Stewart & Paul Ewins

Best Australian Media fanwriter
Hazel Naird

(Remaining categories not voted on due to inadequate nominations.)

1994 Constantinople, April 1–4, Southern Cross Melbourne

Best Fan Writer

James (Jocko) Allen
Paul Ewins
Terry Frost
Jan MacNally
Martin Reilly
Katharine Shade

Best Fan Artist

Ian Gunn
Darren Reid
Steve Scholtz
Kerri Valkova
Phil Wlodarczyk

Best Newsletter

Awaken
Blacklight
Ethel the Aardvark
Get Stuffed
Thyme

Best Fan Fiction Zine

Black Light
Nekros
Spock
Steve and Martin's Excellent Fanzine
Yukkies

Best Amateur Audiovisual Production

Concave Opening Ceremony Russell Devlin
Beky's Brain Phone Answering Message Danny Heap
Star Wars Tribute @ Jedi 10th Darren Maxwell
Starwalking Video, Karen Ogden
Starwalking II Closing Ceremony The Bastards (Danny Heap & Paul Ewins)

1995 Basicon, October 21, Melbourne University

Best Fan Writer
Chris Ballis	
Paul Ewins	
Ian Gunn	
Karen Pender-Gunn

Best Fan Artist
Ian Gunn
Tracy Hamilton
Darren Reid
Catherine Scholz
Steve Scholz
Kerri Valkova

Best News Zine
Coztume, Edited by Gail Adams
Ethel The Aardvark, Edited by Paul Ewins
Pink, Edited by Karen Pender-Gunn
Severed Head, Edited by B.J.Stevens
The Communicator, Edited by Derek Screen
Thyme, Edited by Alan Stewart

Best Fiction Zine
Bobby & Mike #1, Edited by Peter & Jimmy Reilly
Spock, Edited by Katherine Shade
Strange Matter, Edited by Sian O'Neale
The Mentor, Edited by Ron Clarke

Best Audio Visual
Constantinople Closing Ceremony (Performance) by George Ivanoff & Ian GunnConstantinople Masquerade Video (Video Compilation) by Carol TilleyConstantinople Opening Ceremony (Video/Performance) by George Ivanoff & Ian Gunn
Constantinople Party Animation (Computer Animation) by Kerri Valkova

1996: The Festival of the Imagination, April 4–8, Kings Hotel Perth

Best Fan Fiction Zine
 Ethel the Aardvark, edited by Paul Ewins

Best Fan Newsletter
 Thyme, edited by Alan Stewart

Best Media Fan Writer
 Ian Gunn

Best Media Artist
 Ian Gunn

Best Amateur Audio/Visual Production
 The Dalek Tapes (Albert Q.)

1997 Basicon 2, 27–28 September 1997 YWCA Cato Conference Centre, Elizabeth St, Melbourne

Best Australian Fan Fiction ZineAlliance edited by Cavell Gleeson & Jeremy SadlerBabyloney 5 written & illustrated by Peter Reilly

Best Australian Fan Newsletter
The Communicator, edited by Derek ScreenFrontier, edited by Katharine MaxwellOscillation Overthruster, edited by Sue Ann Barber
Thyme, edited by Alan Stewart

Best Australian Media Fan Writer
Sue Ann Barber
Paul Ewins
Ian GunnGeorge IvanoffKaren Pender-Gunn
Margaret Walsh

Best Australian Media Fan Artist
Ian Gunn
Tracy Hamilton
Steve ScholzKerri ValkovaPhil Wlodarczyk

Best Australian Amateur Audio/Visual Production
Enterprise Web Site David Barker (https://web.archive.org/web/19980428161222/http://aba.net.au/people/susien/enterprise/)Star Trek 30th Anniversary Tribute Video (screened at Multiverse II) Danny Heap'''
Zero G (3RRR radio program) Robert Jan

See also
Ditmar Award
Ditmar Award results

Australian science fiction awards